Oldland Common is a railway station on the Avon Valley Railway. The station is on the same site as a previous station which was on the-then LMS Bath branch from Mangotsfield. Then, as now, paths led down to the platforms from North Street. However, until 1966 there were two platforms, one for each direction of travel.

Original station
Oldland Common's first station opened on 2 December 1935 on the LMS branch line that had been originally opened by the Midland Railway through this site in 1869. The station was intended to serve the growing suburban development in the area. It had platforms built of railway sleepers, and a small ticket office on the footpath that led down from the top of the cutting in which it was sited. In its last years before closure with the line on 7 March 1966, it was designated as an unstaffed halt. Due to its simple construction, it was quickly demolished and swept away after closure.

Present station

The line to the site of Oldland Common was reopened by the Avon Valley Railway on 6 March 1991. A new platform was constructed and opened on 6 December 1997. Passengers are invited to leave the train to watch the engine run round its train.

The station lies adjacent to the Bristol and Bath Railway Path.

Services

References

External links 

Avon Valley Railway Website
Gloucestershire Railway Stations, by Mike Oakley, Dovecote Press, 2003

Former London, Midland and Scottish Railway stations
Heritage railway stations in Gloucestershire
Railway stations in Great Britain opened in 1935
Railway stations in Great Britain closed in 1966
Beeching closures in England
1935 establishments in England
Railway stations in Great Britain opened in 1991